The 1996–97 UNC Charlotte 49ers men's basketball team represented the University of North Carolina at Charlotte in the 1996–97 college basketball season. This was head coach Melvin Watkins's first of two seasons at the helm of his alma mater. The 49ers competed in Conference USA and played their home games at Dale F. Halton Arena. They finished the season 22–9 (10–4 in C-USA play) and received an at-large bid to the 1997 NCAA tournament as No. 7 seed in the West region. The 49ers defeated Georgetown in the opening round before losing to No. 2 seed Utah, 77–58, in the round of 32.

Roster

Schedule and results

|-
!colspan=9 style=| Regular season

|-
!colspan=9 style=| C-USA tournament

|-
!colspan=9 style=| NCAA tournament

Rankings

References

Charlotte 49ers men's basketball seasons
Charlotte
Charlotte
Charlotte 49ers men's basket
Charlotte 49ers men's basket